The Football League of the West Godavari District in India has the following teams: Eluru, Bhimavaram, Tanuku, Tadepalligudem, Narasapuram, Jangareddygudem.

References

External links 

Sport in Eluru